The People of Angkor, or Les Gens d'Angkor, is a 2003 French-Cambodian documentary film directed by Rithy Panh.  It was exhibited at the Yamagata International Documentary Film Festival in 2005.

The film follows a young Cambodian boy around the temples of Angkor Wat as older men tell him about the legends depicted on the walls, and tourists tour the site.

2003 films
French documentary films
Khmer-language films
Films directed by Rithy Panh
Cambodian documentary films
2003 documentary films
2000s French films